Pere Jaume Borrell i Guinart, known as Perejaume, (born in 1957 in Sant Pol de Mar, Catalonia) is a Spanish contemporary artist.

Of self-taught formation he takes clear influences of authors like Joan Brossa, with whom he will share work mixing the painting and the poetry.

His work covers a discursive plane of subject matter that includes humans' relationship with nature, the society of the spectacle, and the reevaluation of modernist painting. He has been exhibiting his work around the world since 1990 in such institutions as the Arnolfini Gallery in Bristol, England, the Meyers Bloom Gallery in Santa Monica, California and the Galeria Joan Prats in Barcelona, Catalonia.

In 2005 he was awarded the Catalan National Prize of Visual Arts (granted by the Generalitat de Catalunya), in 2006 the Spanish National Award for Plastic Arts, and in 2007 the Spanish National Prize of Graphic Arts.

Exhibitions
 1984: "Postaler" 
 1988: "A 2.000 metres de pintura sobre el nivell del mar" 
 1989: "Fragments de monarquia" 
 1990: "Galeria Joan Prats, Coll de pal. Cim del Costabona" 
 1997: "Girona, Pineda, Sant Pol i la Vall d'Oo" 
 1999: "Deixar de fer una exposició"
 2000: "Bocamont, Ceret, Figueres, el Prat, Tarragona i Vall" 
 2003: "Retrotabula"

Published books
 1989: Ludwig-Jujol. Què és el collage sinó acostar soledats? 
 1990: El bosc a casa, with Joan Brossa
 1993: La pintura i la boca 
 1995: El paisatge és rodó
 1998: Oïsme
 1999: Dis-Exhibit
 2000: Cartaci, with Joan Brossa
 2003: Obreda
 2004: Cims pensamenters de les reals i verdagueres elevacions
 2007: L'obra i la por
 2011: Pagèsiques (Premi Lletra d'Or, 2012)
 2015: Paraules locals

References

External links
Perejaume's poetry 

Artists from Catalonia
Spanish contemporary artists
1957 births
Living people
People from Maresme